Philadelphe de Gerde (née Claude Duclos: 21 March 1871 in Banios – 22 August 1952 in Gerde) was a French writer, best remembered for her works in Occitan, for which she was considered to be a Felibresse.

References 

1871 births
1952 deaths
French writers